The 1991 Ugandan Super League was the 24th season of the official Ugandan football championship, the top-level football league of Uganda.

Overview
The 1991 Uganda Super League was contested by 12 teams and was won by Kampala City Council FC, while Nytil FC and Busia were relegated.

League standings

Leading goalscorer
The top goalscorer in the 1991 season was Mathias Kaweesa of Coffee Kakira with 18 goals.

References

External links
 Uganda - List of Champions - RSSSF (Hans Schöggl)
 Ugandan Football League Tables - League321.com

Ugandan Super League seasons
1
Uganda
Uganda